Martin Gordan (October 15, 1876 - June 22, 1962) was a German figure skater who competed in men's singles.

He won bronze medals in men's single skating at two World Figure Skating Championships: in 1902 and 1904.

Competitive highlights

References 

German male single skaters
1876 births
1962 deaths